Isis was an electoral district of the Legislative Assembly in the Australian state of Queensland, from 1932 until 1992. It was named after the Shire of Isis in the Wide Bay–Burnett region.

Isis was created in the 1931 redistribution under the Moore government, replacing the former district of Burrum.  It primarily comprised the area between Bundaberg and Maryborough, not including the cities themselves.

Isis was primarily a safe seat for the Country party. Premier Jack Pizzey was the member for Isis from 1950 until his sudden death in 1968. The seat was then won by Labor in the resulting by-election.

Isis was abolished in the 1991 redistribution under the Goss government, being replaced by the new district of Hervey Bay.

Members for Isis

Election results

See also
 Electoral districts of Queensland
 Members of the Queensland Legislative Assembly by year
 :Category:Members of the Queensland Legislative Assembly by name

References

Former electoral districts of Queensland
Constituencies established in 1932
1932 establishments in Australia
Constituencies disestablished in 1992
1992 disestablishments in Australia